Suicide in Kazakhstan is a common cause of unnatural death in the country and a long term social issue. According to the 2011 report of World Health Organization, of all the people reported dead due to suicide worldwide every year, 3.23% belong to Kazakhstan. Suicide of teenaged and young aged people is a big issue in the country. In the age group of 15-49 year olds, suicide makes up for 12.2% of all deaths in Kazakhstan.

Statistics 
The country has highest number of recorded suicides among girls aged 15 to 19, and for boys, it is the second highest after Russia. A UNICEF report of 2009 shows, between 1999 and 2008 the number of suicides among young people of the country increased by 23%.

According to Raisa Sher, head of the country's education ministry's child protection committee, there are several factors behind such high rates of suicide among people of a young age, such as:
 School bullying
 Absence or loss of values
 Falling standards of social behavior
 Alienation

Youth suicide 
According to UNICEF and World Health Organization data, Kazakhstan has the highest suicide level among people aged 15 to 19 in the world. Kazakhstan was 2nd worldwide for suicide among teenage boys, and 1st among suicide for teenage girls.

According to a UNICEF study conducted in five Kazakhstani cities with 1700 teenagers, social issues, family problems and a lack of support were among the main reasons for teenage suicide. According to the study, Kazakhstani parents spend only 20 minutes of 'quality time' with their children a day.

References 

Death in Kazakhstan
Kazakhstan